The 1994 European Archery Championships is  the 13rd edition of the European Archery Championships. The event was held in Nymburk, Czech Republic from 19 to 23 July, 1994.

Medal table

Medal summary

Recurve

Compound

References

External links
 World Archery Europe
 Results

European Archery Championships
1994 in archery
International sports competitions hosted by the Czech Republic
1994 in European sport